Mount Carmel Academy may refer to:

Mount Carmel Academy (Louisiana)
Mount Carmel Academy (Texas)
Mount Carmel Academy (Wichita, Kansas)

See also
Mount Carmel High School (disambiguation)